Roxanne Elizabeth Lowit (February 22, 1942 – September 13, 2022) was an American fashion and celebrity photographer. Lowit was said to have "become as much a celebrity as those she photographed."

Career 
Lowit did not go to school to be a photographer. She graduated from the Fashion Institute of Technology in New York with a degree in art history and textile design. It was during her successful career as a textile designer that she realized something. "I paint and there were people who I wanted to sit for me but had no time, so I started taking pictures of them. I liked the gratification of getting the instant image so I traded in my paintbrushes for a camera."

Lowit started taking pictures in the late 70s with her 110 Instamatic, photographing her own designs at the New York fashion shows. Before long she was covering all the designers in Paris where her friends – models like Jerry Hall – would sneak her backstage. It was there that she found her place (and career) in fashion. "For me, that's where it was happening," she says. "No one thought there was anything going on backstage, so for years I was alone and loved it. I guess I made it look too good because now it's so crowded with photographers. But there's enough room for everybody."

Today, her photographs have appeared in many magazines, such as Italian Vanity Fair, French Elle, V Magazine, and Glamour, and become a vehicle for much of her advertising work, including campaigns for Dior, Barney's NY and Vivienne Westwood.

Solo exhibitions 
 2011  Legendary Privacy; Kaune, Sudendorf Gallery, Cologne, Germany

Publications 
 Roxanne Lowit: Moments (1990)
 Roxanne Lowit: People (2001)
 Roxanne Lowit: "Backstage Dior" foreword and fashion by John Galliano (2009)
 Roxanne Lowit: "Yves Saint Laurent" foreword by Pierre Berge (2014)

References

External links 
 Roxanne Lowit 
 photographers limited editions - Online Gallery
 Steven Kasher Gallery NY Gallery
 lowit/1 Izzy Gallery Toronto Gallery
 Kaune, Posnik, Spohr Gallery Cologne Gallery

1942 births
2022 deaths
20th-century American photographers
20th-century American women photographers
21st-century American photographers
21st-century American women photographers
Fashion Institute of Technology alumni
Photographers from New York (state)